Negative selection is a political process that occurs especially in rigid hierarchies, most notably dictatorships, but also to lesser degrees in such settings as corporations or electoral politics.

The person(s) on the top of the hierarchy, wishing to remain in power forever, chooses their associates with the prime criterion of incompetence; they must not be competent enough to remove the leader from power.  Since subordinates often mimic their leader, these associates do the same with those below them in the hierarchy, and the hierarchy becomes progressively filled over time with more and more incompetent people.

If the leader sees that they are threatened nonetheless, they will purge those that threaten them from their positions. Emptied positions in the hierarchy are normally filled with people from below—those who were less competent than their previous leaders. So over the course of time, the hierarchy turns less and less effective. Once the leader dies, or is removed by some external force, what remains is a grossly ineffective hierarchy.

In a famous anecdote from Herodotus's Histories, a messenger from Periander asks Thrasybulus for advice on ruling. Thrasybulus, instead of responding, takes the messenger for a walk in a field of wheat, where he proceeds to cut off all of the best and tallest ears of wheat. The message, correctly interpreted by Periander, was that a wise ruler would preempt challenges to his rule by "removing" those prominent men who might be powerful enough to challenge him.

See also

References

 
Egorov, Georgy, and Konstantin Sonin. "Incumbency Advantage in Non-Democratic Elections." Annual Meeting of the Midwest Political Science Association, Chicago. 2011.
Neo-Feudalism Explained

Selection